is a Japanese manga artist.  Her debut short story, Ore-tachi no Zettai Jikan ("This is the Time for Us"), was published in 1983 in Bessatsu Shōjo Comic and received the 1983 Shogakukan Grand Prize for new artists. Since then, she has completed more than 50 compiled volumes of short stories and continuing series. Popular works such as Tomoe ga Yuku! ("There goes Tomoe") exemplify her work, but she made her reputation with the long-running shōjo action/adventure series Basara, for which she won the 1993 Shogakukan Manga Award for the shōjo category.  Her series 7 Seeds, for which she won a second Shogakukan Manga Award for the shōjo category in 2007, ran in the anthology magazine Flowers in Japan. Chicago was her first series to be published in North America. In 2021, she won a third Shogakukan Manga Award for general manga for her latest series Don't Call it Mystery.

In addition to manga, she has published four novels with illustrations by herself, as well as doing character designs for Square's Super Famicom RPG Live A Live'''s Science Fiction chapter, "Mechanical Heart."

 Works 

 7 Seeds (2001-2017)
 17 Nichime no Chopin  (1987)
 Ano Natsu ga Owaru (1987)
 Bishop no Wa (1990)
 Basara (1990–1998)
 Boku ga Tenshi wo Unda Riyuu (1992)
 Boku ga Boku wo Wasureta Riyuu (1993)
 Boku ga Santa ni Atta Riyuu (1994)
 Boku ga Gomi wo Suteta Riyuu (1995)
 Boku ga Juuban Shoubusuru Wake (2001)
 Bokura no Mura ni wa Mizuumi ga atta (2007)
 Box Kei! (2000)
 Chicago (2000–2001)
 Chotto Eiyuushite Mitai (2003)
 Don't Call it Mystery (2017–)
 Hare Tokidoki Yami (1999)
 Hearts (1996)
 Madonna ni Tsugu (1992)
 Megami ga Ochita Hi (1995)
 Neko Mix Genkitan Toraji (2008-ongoing)
 Odoru Kyoushitsu (1999)
 Ore-tachi no Zettai Jikan (1983)
 Ouji-kun (1999)
 Roppongi Shinjuu (1991)
 Shinwa ni Natta Gogo (1986)
 Tamura Yumi the Best Selection (2008)
 Tomoe ga Yuku! (1987–1990)
 Toorima 1991 (1998)
 Wangan Jungle (2002)
 Wild Com. (1999)
 X-Day'' (1993)

References

External links
 
 Profile  at The Ultimate Manga Guide

Japanese women writers
Living people
People from Wakayama Prefecture
Japanese female comics artists
Female comics writers
Women manga artists
Manga artists from Wakayama Prefecture
Year of birth missing (living people)